Starbaeckia is a genus of fungi in the Helotiales order and in the family Phacidiaceae. This is a monotypic genus, containing the single species Starbaeckia pseudotryblidioides.

The genus was circumscribed by Heinrich Simon Ludwig Friedrich Felix Rehm in Bih. Kongl. Svenska Vetensk.-Akad. Handl.
16(Afd. 3,3): Titelblatt, 3, 11. in 1890.

The genus name of Starbaeckia is in honour of Karl Starbäck (1863–1931), who was a Swedish botanist teacher, and member of parliament (the Riksdag, from 1902-1924). He was a doctor of philosophy in 1894 at Uppsala University and then he was also Professor of Natural Sciences and Chemistry between 1902-1928 in Gävle.

References

External links
Index Fungorum

Helotiales
Monotypic Leotiomycetes genera